Virginia's 19th House of Delegates district elects one of 100 seats in the Virginia House of Delegates, the lower house of the state's bicameral legislature. District 19 represents the city of Covington, Alleghany County and parts of Bedford and Botetourt counties. The seat is currently held by Republican Terry L. Austin.

District officeholders

References

Virginia House of Delegates districts
Covington, Virginia
Alleghany County, Virginia
Bedford County, Virginia
Botetourt County, Virginia